Frank A. Moran is an American state legislator serving in the Massachusetts House of Representatives. He served on the Lawrence, Massachusetts City Council from 20082013, including three years as Council President. He is a member of the Massachusetts Black and Latino Legislative Caucus.

See also
 2019–2020 Massachusetts legislature
 2021–2022 Massachusetts legislature

References

Frank A. Moran. Massachusetts General Court.

Democratic Party members of the Massachusetts House of Representatives
Living people
21st-century American politicians
Year of birth missing (living people)
Politicians from Lawrence, Massachusetts
Massachusetts city council members